Cherryville may refer to one of the following places:
 Cherryville, British Columbia
 Cherryville, Missouri
 Cherryville, New Jersey
 Cherryville, North Carolina
 Cherryville, Oregon
 Cherryville, Pennsylvania
 Cherryville, South Australia